Somewhere in Time is the sixth studio album by American country rock band Reckless Kelly. It was released on February 9, 2010 by Yep Roc Records. The album peaked at number 22 on the Billboard Top Country Albums chart.

Track listing
"Little Blossom" (Pinto Bennett) – 5:00
"The Ballad of Elano Deleon" (Bennett) – 3:25
"Bird on a Wire" (Bennett) – 3:36
"Everything I Could Do Wrong" (Bennett, Richard Dobson) – 4:13
"Some People's Kids" (Bennett) – 3:05
"I Hold the Bottle, You Hold the Wheel" (Bennett) – 3:32
"Best Forever Yet" (Bennett) – 3:21
"Idaho Cowboy" (Bennett, Baxter Black) – 3:07
"Pure Quill" (Bennett) – 4:14
"You Cared Enough to Lie" (Bennett, Sergio Webb) – 2:56
"Thelma" (Bennett, Black) – 4:10
"Somewhere in Time" (Bennett, Webb) – 3:32

Chart performance

References

2010 albums
Reckless Kelly (band) albums
Yep Roc Records albums